Frederick Alexander Campbell (17 January 1911 – 11 September 1995) was a member of the Queensland Legislative Assembly.

Biography
Campbell was born in Brisbane, Queensland, the son of Matthew Hale Campbell and his wife Annie Jessie (née Jullyan). He was educated in Brisbane and worked in the family poultry business after he left school. He later was an insurance officer specializing in fire and general insurance.

On 14 May 1936 he married Ellen McConachie (died 2008) and together had a son and two daughters. Campbell died in September 1995 and was cremated at Albany Creek Crematorium.

Public career
Campbell, for the  Liberal Party, won the new seat of Aspley at the 1960 Queensland state election. He represented the seat for twenty years before retiring at the 1980 state election.

Nicknamed affectionately as "Chooky" by the then Labor opposition, Campbell held several ministerial portfolios whilst in politics including:
 Minister for Labour Relations 1977-1980
 Minister for Industrial Development 1967-1972
 Minister for Development and Industrial Affairs 1972-1974
 Minister for Industrial Development, Labour Relations and Consumer Affairs 1974-1977
 Minister for Transport 1977
 Deputy Leader of the Parliamentary Liberal Party 1976-1980

References

Members of the Queensland Legislative Assembly
1911 births
1995 deaths
Liberal Party of Australia members of the Parliament of Queensland
People educated at Brisbane State High School
20th-century Australian politicians